Kenneth Noel Corbett Bray FRS is emeritus professor at University of Cambridge.

Life
He was editor of Combustion and Flame from 1981 to 1986.

Works
"Studies of the Turbulent Burning Velocity", K. N. C. Bray, Proceedings: Mathematical and Physical Sciences, Vol. 431, No. 1882 (8 November 1990), pp. 315–335

References

External links

English mechanical engineers
Engineering professors at the University of Cambridge
Fellows of the Royal Society
Living people
Fellows of The Combustion Institute
Year of birth missing (living people)